The 2015–16 Toledo Rockets women's basketball team represents University of Toledo during the 2015–16 NCAA Division I women's basketball season. The Rockets, led by eighth year head coach Tricia Cullop, played their home games at Savage Arena, as members of the West Division of the Mid-American Conference. They finished the season 17–13, 12–6 in MAC play to finish in third place in the West Division. They lost in the quarterfinals of the MAC women's tournament to Akron.

Roster

Schedule and results
Source: 

|-
!colspan=9 style="background:#000080; color:#F9D819;"| Exhibition

|-
!colspan=9 style="background:#000080; color:#F9D819;"| Non-conference games

|-
!colspan=9 style="background:#000080; color:#F9D819;"| Mid-American Conference games

|-
!colspan=9 style="background:#000080; color:#F9D819;"| MAC Women's Tournament

See also
 2015–16 Toledo Rockets men's basketball team

References
2015–16 Toledo Media Guide

Toledo
Toledo Rockets women's basketball seasons